H is the eighth letter of the Latin alphabet.

H may also refer to:

Musical symbols 
 H number, Harry Halbreich reference mechanism for music by Honegger and Martinů 
 H, B (musical note)
 H, B major

People 
 H. (noble) (died after 1279), an unidentified nobleman in the Kingdom of Hungary who served as master of the horse
 H. (1900–1995), British activist and economist Edgar Hardcastle 
 H (born 1957), British guitarist Adrian Smith 
 H (born 1976), British singer Ian Watkins (Steps)
 h (born 1959), British vocalist Steve Hogarth 
 H (born 1981/82), one of the attackers in the Sydney gang rapes
 H. (born 1925), girl who gave birth to a child when she was six years old
H Waldman (born 1972), American-Israeli basketball player

Science and mathematics 
 h, hour
 h, hecto-, the SI prefix for hundred or 102

Biology
 Haplogroup H
 Haplogroup H (mtDNA), human mitochondrial DNA 
 Haplogroup H (Y-DNA), human Y-chromosome DNA
 ATC code H Systemic hormonal preparations, excluding sex hormones and insulins, a section of the Anatomical Therapeutic Chemical Classification System
 Fay and Wu's H, a statistical test used in DNA analysis

Chemistry
 Hydrogen, symbol H, a chemical element
 H, code for a formulation of sulfur mustard
 H (or His), an abbreviation for the amino acid histidine

Computer science
 Language H, procedural programming language
 .h, the filename extension for the C include directive called header

Linguistics
 , the International Phonetic Alphabet symbol for a voiceless glottal fricative sound
 H or high, the high-prestige register in a diglossia

Mathematics
 H, the upper half-plane of the complex numbers
 , the Heaviside step function
 h, impulse response in LTI system theory
 H, system function, system response, or transfer function in LTI system theory

Physics and cosmology

Constants
 h, Planck constant
 H, Hubble constant 
 h, dimensionless Hubble constant

Measures
 H, absolute magnitude in the context of the Solar system
 H (as in ), magnitude of enthalpy
 h, convective heat transfer coefficient
 H, magnetic field intensity

Other uses in physics
 H, symbol for the Henry (unit), the SI derived unit of inductance
 H0, the symbol of the Higgs boson

Planets 
 H, distortion of symbol  for Uranus
 h, distortion of symbol  for Saturn

Other uses in science
 h-index, an author-level metric of the productivity and citation impact of the publications of a scientist or scholar

Arts and media

Film and TV 
 H (1990 film), a 1990 Canadian film
 H (2002 film), a 2002 Korean film
 H. (2014 film), a 2014 American film by Rania Attieh and Daniel Garcia
 H (TV series), a 1998-2002 French TV series
 H, the production code for the 1964 Doctor Who serial The Reign of Terror
 H, a codename used to refer to an anonymous individual in the police procedural drama Line of Duty
 "H", the fifth episode of the sixth series of Taskmaster that aired in 2018

Music
h, a 1990 compilation album by Hitomi (singer)
H, a 1980  album by Bob James (musician)
 H (Ayumi Hamasaki EP), 2002
 H (Lee Hae-ri EP), 2017
 "H." (song), a song by Tool on their 1996 Ænima album

Other media
H (magazine)
 Revista H, a monthly Mexican men's magazine
 "H" Is for Homicide, the eighth novel in Sue Grafton's "Alphabet mystery" series, published in 1991

Other uses

 Heroin
 Н, a letter of the Cyrillic alphabet analogous to N
 Һ, letter Shha of the Cyrillic alphabet
 Trains:
 H (S-train), a train service in Metropolitan Copenhagen
 H, Rockaway Park Shuttle subway service in New York 
 Line H of the Buenos Aires Subte
 H, a Hitachi, Ltd. mobile phone
 H, sexual content or activity, associated with Japanese "Hentai"
 Hurricane tie, used in construction
 Conservative Party of Norway (Høyre)
 The military designation for helicopters, such as the UH-60 Blackhawk and AH-64 Apache
 H, a symbol for a heliport
 H, the international license plate code of Hungary
 Hit (baseball)
 Farmall H, a tractor produced by International Harvester from 1939 to 1953
 Hotel, the military time zone code for UTC+08:00

See also
 Aitch (disambiguation)
 H class (disambiguation)
 H band (disambiguation)
 ^H, characters representing the backspace control code 
 հ, an Armenian letter
 ㅐ, a Korean letter
 Ħ (H with stroke), a Maltese letter
 Н, a Cyrillic capital letter "En"
 Η, Greek capital letter eta

ca:H#Significats de H
he:H#משמעויות נוספות של האות H
la:H#Abbreviationes
hu:H#Jelentései
ja:H#Hの意味
nn:H#Bruk
simple:H#Meanings for H
fi:H#H-kirjaimen merkityksiä
sv:H#Betydelser